Tsvetan Nikolov Yotov (born 3 June 1989, in Stamboliyski) is a Bulgarian football player who currently plays for Gigant Saedinenie as a centre-back.

Career
On 5 July 2011, Yotov signed with the elite club Cherno More after a successful trial period. He couldn't break into the team and was released in July 2012.  He went on trial at Lokomotiv Plovdiv and later re-joined his old club Spartak Plovdiv in 2013. On 26 January 2014, Yotov left Spartak Plovdiv, joining Rakovski in B PFG. On 27 February 2015, following Rakovski's dissolution, Yotov signed with Gigant Saedinenie. On 12 June 2017, he moved to his hometown club Maritsa Plovdiv.

References

External links

Living people
1989 births
Bulgarian footballers
Association football defenders
FC Maritsa Plovdiv players
PFC Lokomotiv Plovdiv players
FC Spartak Plovdiv players
PFC Cherno More Varna players
First Professional Football League (Bulgaria) players
Second Professional Football League (Bulgaria) players